Haliella stenostoma is a species of sea snail, a marine gastropod mollusk in the family Eulimidae.

Distribution

This species occurs in the following locations:

 European waters (ERMS scope)
 North West Atlantic
 Portuguese Exclusive Economic Zone
 Spanish Exclusive Economic Zone
 Swedish Exclusive Economic Zone
 United Kingdom Exclusive Economic Zone

Description 
The maximum recorded shell length is 8.5 mm.

Habitat 
Minimum recorded depth is 749 m. Maximum recorded depth is 2022 m.

References

External links

Eulimidae
Gastropods described in 1858